Tobias F. "Toby" McDonald,  (born c. 1949) is a Canadian curler, curling coach and lawyer from St. John's, Newfoundland and Labrador.

At the national level, he won the 1976 Macdonald Brier, as a member of the first ever team from Newfoundland and Labrador to win the Brier.

He coached the Canadian men's curling team at the 2006 Winter Olympics where they won the gold medal.

Teams

Record as a coach of national teams

Awards
 Ross Harstone Sportsmanship Award: .
 Order of Newfoundland and Labrador, appointed 2006.

References

External links
 
 
 Toby McDonald – Curling Canada Stats Archive
 
 
 
 
 
 

Living people
Canadian male curlers
Brier champions
Canadian curling coaches
Members of the Order of Newfoundland and Labrador
Lawyers in Newfoundland and Labrador
University of New Brunswick alumni
Sportspeople from St. John's, Newfoundland and Labrador
Place of birth missing (living people)
Curlers from Newfoundland and Labrador
Year of birth missing (living people)